Bear Mountain is a peak in the Tehachapi Mountains,  near Tehachapi, California.

The mountain is north of Bear Valley Springs, and west of the Tehachapi Loop, a spiral on the railroad line through Tehachapi Pass. California condors, mountain lions, mule deer and bobcats can be found among the sugar pines trees.

Much of the mountain is on land owned by The Nature Conservancy.

References

External links 
 

Mountains of Kern County, California
Tehachapi Mountains
Mountains of Southern California